Andrea Patricia Clausen (born 1971) is a British-born Falkland Islands politician who served as a Member of the Legislative Assembly for the Stanley constituency from 2005 until 2009. Clausen was elected as a Member of the Legislative Council, which was reconstituted into the Legislative Assembly with the implementation of the 2009 Constitution.

Clausen was born in Guisborough, England and grew up in the Falklands after her family moved to the islands when she was three. She then went on to study Marine Biology at Bangor University where she gained a PhD in the subject. Clausen then moved back to the Falklands to work as a Scientific Officer for Falklands Conservation.

Clausen was elected to the Legislative Council at the 2005 general election, but lost her seat four years later in the 2009 general election.

References

1971 births
Living people
Alumni of Bangor University
People from Guisborough
Falkland Islands Councillors 2005–2009
English emigrants to the Falkland Islands
Falkland Islands women in politics
21st-century British women politicians